"Come Around" is a song by American rock band Papa Roach. It was their third single off of their album Who Do You Trust?. It topped the Billboard Mainstream Rock Songs chart in December 2019.

Background and themes 
The song was released as the third single from the band's tenth studio album, Who Do You Trust?. A music video was released for the single in September 2019. Lyrically, frontman Jacoby Shaddix states that the song is about sticking with friends and loved ones during hard times in their lives. The song was written around mental health awareness, with Shaddix elaborating that it was also about the power of music to connect with people to overcome adversity. Shaddix stated that the song was about himself to a certain capacity as well, in his feeling that music helps him feel connected to something "bigger than [him]self". The song's music video plays into the themes as well, focusing on a fan that was affected by the band's music. The video focuses around the band's long-time fan Mark Moreno, who had followed the band since their breakout in 2000, and had attended over 60 lives shows since then. The band invite Moreno to a concert, thank him for his support, give him a plaque to honor his sister who had died in 2016, and awarded him two tickets for Papa Roach live shows for life.

Reception
The song and music video was generally well received, with Rock Sound calling it "heartwarming" and "genuinely, genuinely great". Allmusic similarly praised the track for being "heartfelt" with Shaddix's "emotive croon" standing out on the track.

Personnel
 Jacoby Shaddix – lead vocals
 Jerry Horton – guitar
 Tobin Esperance – bass
 Tony Palermo – drums

Charts

References

2018 songs
2019 singles
Papa Roach songs
Eleven Seven Label Group singles
Songs written by Nicholas Furlong (musician)
Songs written by Jacoby Shaddix
Songs written by Jerry Horton
Songs written by Tobin Esperance
Songs written by Colin Brittain